Reuth may refer to the following places in Germany:

Reuth, Rhineland-Palatinate, in the Vulkaneifel district, Rhineland-Palatinate
Reuth, Saxony, in the Vogtlandkreis district, Saxony
Reuth bei Erbendorf, in the district of Tirschenreuth, Bavaria
Reuth (organization), Israeli women's charity and provider of non-profit health services for the disadvantaged.